Telma may refer to:

Telma (TV channel), a channel in North Macedonia
Gondysia telma, a moth
Telma, an Israeli brand owned by Unilever
Telma retarder, a type of eddy current brake

Places
Telma Darreh, a village in Iran
Telma (urban-type settlement), a locality in Irkutsk Oblast, Russia
Telma, Washington, US, an unincorporated community

People
August & Telma, an Icelandic singing duo
Telma Björk Fjalarsdóttir (born 1984), Icelandic former basketball player
Telma Hopkins (born 1948), American actress
Telma Monteiro (born 1985), Portuguese judoka
Telma Santos (born 1983), Portuguese badminton player

See also
Telmar, a fictional country in C. S. Lewis's Narnia
Thelma (disambiguation)